Origen was a third-century Christian theologian.

Origen may also refer to:
Origen (esports), a European esports team
Origen the Pagan, a third-century Platonist philosopher
Adamantius (Pseudo-Origen), a fourth-century Christian writer
Origen (band), a pop/rock band in Miami, Florida

See also
Orijen, a brand of dog food and cat food manufactured in Alberta, Canada
Origin (disambiguation)
Penitence of Origen, a text attributed to Origen of Alexandria